The 2014 Open Saint-Gaudens Midi-Pyrénées was a professional tennis tournament played on outdoor clay courts. It was the eighteenth edition of the tournament and part of the 2014 ITF Women's Circuit, offering a total of $50,000+H in prize money. It took place in Saint-Gaudens, Haute-Garonne, France, on 12–18 May 2014.

Singles main draw entrants

Seeds 

 1 Rankings as of 5 May 2014

Other entrants 
The following players received wildcards into the singles main draw:
  Amandine Hesse
  Stéphanie Foretz Gacon
  Deniz Khazaniuk
  Jade Suvrijn

The following players received entry from the qualifying draw:
  Nigina Abduraimova
  Bianca Botto
  Fiona Ferro
  Ekaterine Gorgodze

The following player received entry into the singles main draw as a lucky loser:
  Myrtille Georges

The following player received entry with a junior exempt:
  Ana Konjuh

Champions

Singles 

  Danka Kovinić def.  Pauline Parmentier 6–1, 6–2

Doubles 

  Verónica Cepede Royg /  María Irigoyen def.  Sharon Fichman /  Johanna Konta 7–5, 6–3

External links 
 2014 Open Saint-Gaudens Midi-Pyrénées at ITFtennis.com
  

2014 ITF Women's Circuit
Engie
2014 in French tennis